Hadag Nahash is an Israeli hip hop/funk band, founded in 1996 in Jerusalem. The band is known for its leftist political statements in many of its songs. Some of the band's songs have been used in protests.

Name and symbols 
The group's name means "The Fish-Snake". It is also, however, a Hebrew spoonerism on the phrase  ("New Driver"), which appears on signs which must be affixed to the back of vehicles driven by people who have just recently received a driving license.

The band's icon, depicting a child urinating, comes from a Hebrew idiom loosely translated as I will show you from where the fish pisses meaning something akin to "I will show you how it's done."

Musical style
Like many Israeli pop musicians such as Teapacks and the Idan Raichel project, Hadag Nahash blends Western pop music with Eastern elements to create a sound tapestry containing influences from funk and world music. The band notes that although its style is hip-hop-oriented, its music is placed in that section in Israel because marketing executives at the group's label did not know how to classify the band's style, despite it being closer to groups such as the Brand New Heavies rather than Wu-Tang Clan or A Tribe Called Quest.

History

Hadag Nahash has been a major contributor to the Israeli hip-hop scene, and is presently one of Israel's most successful bands, with eight studio albums released to date.
The band's songs call for peace, tolerance and equality, and include political and social protest. Most songs are written by Sha'anan Streett, the band's lead vocalist.

On 15 September 2000, Hadag Nahash released its first studio album "Hamechona Shel Hagroove" ("The Groove Machine"), which was written by and composed by the entire band. The album included well-known songs such as "Lo Mevater" and "Af Ehad," which both featured Israeli singer Mazi Cohen.

Hadag Nahash's second studio album, "Lazuz" ("To Move"), was released on 10 January 2003 and produced by Yossi Fine. The album was an immediate success and sold over 30,000 copies, with hits such as "Gabi ve Debi," "Misparim," and "Lo Frayerim." The song "Bella Belissima" was also featured on popular crime drama TV show NCIS in 2007, creating a path for Hadag Nahash music to trickle in through to the United States and worldwide. The album featured famous Israeli musicians such as Berry Sakharof.

"Gabi ve Debi" was notable for its political message. Hadag Nahash sings about meeting Gabby and Debby, characters from a children's show that was part of the Let's Learn English series, who, in the show, had a magic stick that could transport them to any time and place. They offer to take the narrator wherever he wants – as long as it has a positive Zionistic message for the children. The three visit first Herzl and then Trumpeldor, two famous promoters of Zionism, and find each to be a far cry from their idealized images. Most notably they see Herzl on drugs and offering them some, using a paraphrase of the motto of Zionism: "'if you wish it, it is no fairy-tale." This audacious and controversial song is typical of Hadag Nahash.

Yossi Fine also produced the band's third studio album, "Homer Mekomi" ("Local Material"), which was released in 2004. The biggest hit out of the album was "Shirat Hasticker" ("The Sticker Song"), which was written by Israeli novelist David Grossman. The lines of the song are all slogans seen on Israeli bumper stickers. The opposing political slogans are juxtaposed to create an angry and ironic portrait of political and religious life in Israel. Other notable songs from the album are "Halifot," "Hakafa Metzaltzelet" and "Rak Po". The album attained platinum status and the band was named Band of the Year by Galgalatz and Reshet Gimel, Israel's leading popular radio stations.

In 2006, Hadag Nahash released their fourth studio album, "Be'ezrat Hajam" (With Help of the Jam, a wordplay on the expression "With God's Help"), which was named Album of the Year at the Israel Music Awards. The album, recorded at In the Pocket studios in California, was the first album in which the vocals were divided equally between Sha'anan Streett and DJ Guy Mar. "Be'ezrat Hajam" contained the hit "Hine Ani Ba" ("Here I Come") written by Guy Mar about moving from his hometown Jerusalem to Tel Aviv. "Hine Ani Ba" is also an example of a song with a political or cultural message, as it depicts a cultural struggle between Jerusalem, a symbol of Israel's heritage, and Tel Aviv, a hub for young people and nightlife. One marker of its success is that this song is also featured in the Adam Sandler movie You Don't Mess with the Zohan.

In March 2008 Hadag Nahash released its first live album, Hadag Nahash Live, released both as a CD and a DVD.

In December 2009, Hadag Nahash released the first single from its sixth album (fifth studio album), 6: a protest song against the rising internal violence in Israeli society, called "Od Ach Ehad" ("One More Brother"). Further singles from the album were "Shir Nehama," which featured Israeli traditional guitarist Yehuda Keisar; "Ani Ma'amin"; and "Lo Maspik." The latter was selected by EA Games for soundtrack of The Sims 3 expansion pack The Sims 3: Late Night, and was re-recorded in Simlish.

In February 2013, Hadag Nahash released their sixth studio album, "Zman Lehitorer" (Time To Wake Up). This album included hit songs such as "Zman Lehitorer", "Kovlana Al Miflagot Israel", "Pizmon", and "Yom Shishi".

In March 2016, the band's seventh studio album, "Shutafim Ba'am" (Partners of the People), was released. It included songs such as "Ten Ii Mangina", which was worked on with Israeli artist Avraham Tal, "Lo Ma She Yapil Oti", which featured rapper Peled, and "Legal Eyes", which was released in both Hebrew and English.

Hadag Nahash released their hit single "Od Yihye Tov" (Things Will Get Better) in early 2017, and it climbed to the top of the charts instantly. Since their first album in 2000, the music of Hadag Nahash has reached worldwide, even stretching to Western countries such as the United States, the United Kingdom, and Australia.

Their eighth studio album, "Welcome to Israel", was released in March 2018, and it instantly took off. It features 14 brand-new songs, including the previously-released singles "Od Yihye Tov" (Things Will Get Better), "Matzbi'im BaRaglaim" (Vote With Your Feet), and "Sa!" (Go!). The title song, "Welcome to Israel", is an eclectic, traditional Middle-Eastern-style song, which perfectly reflects the tone of the album. This album draws influences from famed music styles such as dubstep and electronica, while still keeping in line with the traditional flavour of Hadag Nahash which audiences around the world love.

Their second-most recent song, was released as a single on 3 August 2020 and was produced by Johnny Goldstein. The lyrics reference ongoing protests against the thirty-fifth government of Israel, calling to "break the cycle of Miri, Bibi, Miki, Bibi, Benny, Bibi" and asking for the release of Avera Mengistu.

Group members

Current members 

Sha'anan Streett (שאנן סטריט) - Rapping, Vocals (1996–present)
Yair "Yaya" Cohen-Harounoff (יאיר "יאיא" כהן־אהרונוב) - Bass guitar, Backing vocals (1996–present)
David "Dudush" Klemes (דוד "דודוש" קלמס) - Keyboard (1996–present)
Moshe "Atraf" Asaraf (משה "אטרף" אסרף) - Drums (1996–present)
Guy "DJ Guy Mar" Margalit (מרגלית "DJ גיא "גיא מר) - Rapping, Vocals, Turntables, Sampling (1998-present)
Shlomi Alon (שלומי אלון) - Saxophone, Flute, EWI, Rapping, Vocals (2001-present)

Touring members

Daniel Shoham (דניאל שוהם) - Guitar
Matan Gov Ari (מתן גוב־ארי) - Trumpet
Yair Slutzki  (יאיר סלוצקי)- Trombone

Former members
Shahar Mintz ((שחר מינץ- Guitar (1996-1998)
Yaron Mohar (ירון מוהר)- Saxophone (1996-2001)
Meir Shalivo (מאיר שליבו)- Trumpet (1996-2000)
Amir Ben Ami (אמיר בן־עמי)- Guitar (1998-2007)
Rafi Malkiel (רפי מלכיאל)- Trombone (2000-2003)
Yossi Fine (יוסי פיין)- Guitar
Avi Lebovich (אבי לייבוביץ׳)- Trombone
Guy David (גיא דוד)- Trumpet
Nir Mantzur (ניר מנצור)- Percussion
DJ Johnny Balista- Turntables
Yotam Afik (יותם אפיק)- Guitar
Roy "Shu Ismak" Sunak (רוי "שו איסמק" סונק)- Trumpet

Timeline

Discography

Studio albums

HaMekhona Shel HaGruv (The Groove Machine, 2000)
Lo Mevater ("Not Giving Up")
HaMekhona Shel HaGruv ("The Groove Machine")
Shalom Salaam Peace
Jerusalem
Trumpeldor
Mebit [Eize Ganuv!] ("Look Ahead [So Kewl!]")
Af Ehad ("No One")
Avaryan ("Criminal")
Tza'atzua' ("Toy")
HaVolyum Ole ("The Volume Rises")
Ha-Dag Nahash [Jam] ("Hadag Nahash [Jam]")
Kusamamak ("Motherfucker")
Lazuz (To Move, 2003)
Kamti ("I Got Up")
Lazuz ("To Move")
Sod HaHatzlaha ("Secret to Success")
Misparim ("Numbers")
Lo Frayerim ("Not Suckers")
Frayerim ("Suckers")
Gabi VeDebi ("Gabi And Debi")
Gan Eden ("Garden Of Eden")
Gan HaTut ("The Strawberry Garden")
Bela Belisima
Belis Dub
Mekhonat HaTut ("The Strawberry Machine")
Ze Lo Ani ("It Wasn't Me")
Homer Mekomi (Local Material, 2004)
Mithamem ("It's Heating Up")
Bereshit ("In The Beginning; Genesis")
Shirat Hasticker ("The Sticker Song")
Halifot ("Uniforms")
Johnny HaKatan ("Little Johnny")
HaKafa HaMetzaltzelet ("The Ringing Slap")
HaPe Liftoah ("The Mouth To Open")
Shvita ("Strike")
Muzika ("Music")
Yatziv ("Stable")
Rak Po ("Only Here")
Melodika ("Melody")
Ma Na'ase? ("What Can We Do?")
Ratziti SheTeda' (Elohim Sheli) ("I Wanted You to Know [My God]")
Be'ezrat HaJam (With The Help Of The Jam, 2006)
Lotus
California
Ma SheBa Ba ("What Comes Comes")
Hine Ani Ba ("Here I Come")
Kol HaCucot ("All The Čučot")
Lehitchalek Ba'Ir ("To Share The City")
Statistika ("Statistics")
Saga
MehaBama Lehaftzitz ("To Bomb From The Stage")
Tiraga' ("Relax")
Eize Keyf ("What Fun")
Lehavi' Et HaMaka ("To Bring The Hit")
Shabhi Yerushalayim ("Bless Jerusalem")
6 (2010)
Super Groove
Ani Ma'amin ("I Believe")
Lo Maspik ("Not Enough")
Shir Nehama ("Consolation Song")
BaSalon Shel Salomon ("In Salomon's Living Room")
Od Ah Ehad ("One More Brother")
Little Man
Many Lights
Jambalaya
Ma'arbolet Shel Hol ("Vortex of Sand")
War
Super Groove
That Ain't What It's All About
Zman LeHit'orer ("Time To Wake Up", 2013)
Mistovev ("Wandering Around")
Mabsut ("Satisfied")
Zman Lehit'orer ("Time To Wake Up")
Meir Ma'Ir ("Meir Comments")
Koblena Al Miflagot Yisrael ("A Complaint About Israel's Political Partys")
Eineni Boged ("I'm Not A Traitor")
Pizmon ("Chorus")
Hakol Yistader ("Everything Will Be Alright")
Noga'at ("She Touches")
XL
Maher ("Fast")
Ilu Ze Haya ("If It Was")
Yom Shishi ("Friday")
Shutafim Ba'am (Partners of the People, 2016)
Ten Li Mangina ("Give Me a Melody")
Ad HaSof ("Until the End")
Shutafim Smuyim ("Hidden Partners")
Ra'ada HaAdama ("The Earth Quaked")
Shemesh ("Sun")
Lo Ma SheYapil Oti ("Not What Would Knock Me Down")
Resisim El HaHof ("Shrapnel on the Beach")
Af Itakh ("Flying with You")
Hakol Hozer ("Everything Comes Back")
Ezrah Shel HaOlam  ("Citizen of the World")
Legal Eyes
Marvadim ("Carpets")
Welcome to Izrael (2018)
Sa (Go)
Welcome to Izrael
Matzbiim BaRagalim (Vote With Your Feet)
Tipot Shel Or (Drops of Light)
Ana Anachnu (feat. Tzlil Danin)
Seret Milhama (War Movie)
Yotse Laderech (Sets Off On The Path)
Meshahrer (Liberator)
Yomuledet 40 (40th Birthday)
Bua (Bubble) 
Od Yihye Tov (Things Will Get Better)
El Hazipor (To The Bird)
Bayamim Balaylot (By Day, By Night)
Etsba Meshuleshet (Middle Finger)

Live albums
Hadag Nahash: Live (2008)
"Lotus" (5:38) 
"California" (4:06)
"Lazuz" (4:44) 
"Misparim" (2:47) 
"Halifot" (5:39)
"Statistika" (4:35)
"Af Ehad" (3:37)
"Ma SheBa Ba" (4:06) 
"HaKafa HaMetzaltzelet" (4:47)
"Kol HaManayak" (3:53)
"Ma Na'ase" (7:20)
"Lo Mevater" (6:42) 
"Eize Kef" (5:49)
"MeHaBama Lehaftzitz" (4:46)
"Lo Frayerim" (4:47) 
"Shirat HaSticker" (6:53)
"Hine Ani Ba" (5:28)
"Gan HaTut" (5:25)
"Shibhi Yerushalaim" (4:07)
"Ratziti SheTada" (5:53)
"Lehavi Et HaMaka" (8:32)
Hofa'a Haya ("live performance", 2015)
Ani Maamin
BaSalon Shel Salomon
Machrozet: Lo Maspik, Lo Mevater, Lo Frayerim
En Li Af Ehad (feat. Efrat Ashkenazi)
Misparim 
Hakafa Ha Metzalzelet
Little Man
Maarbolet Shel Hol
Shir Nehama
Ratziti She Teda 
Gabi Ve Debby (Hip Hop Zioni)

References

External links

Official site

Israeli hip hop groups
Jewish hip hop groups
Musical groups established in 1996
Musical groups from Jerusalem
1996 establishments in Israel
Israeli funk musical groups